"Somebody Needs You" is a song written by Motown songwriter Frank Wilson. It was originally released as a non-album track by R&B duo Ike & Tina Turner on Loma Records in May 1965. In 1966, soul singer Darrell Banks reached the Billboard charts with his rendition.

Characterized by a "driving rock" melody, Cash Box described Ike & Tina Turner's single as a "Detroit styled throbber." A live version was included on the album The Ike & Tina Turner Show Vol. 2 (Loma Records, 1967). The song later appeared on the compilation Finger Poppin'…The Warner Brothers Years (Edsel Records, 1988).

Darrell Banks version 

Darrell Banks released a version titled "Somebody (Somewhere) Needs You" on Revilot Records in September 1966. His record reached No. 55 on the Billboard Hot 100 and  No. 34 on the R&B chart. Reviewing the single, Billboard (October 1, 1966) wrote: "Moving is the word for the new Darrell Banks disk and there's no holding it back. Should be his second smash!" 

The song appeared on his debut album Darrell Banks Is Here!, released by Atco Records in 1967.

Chart performance

References 
1965 songs
1965 singles
Ike & Tina Turner songs
Songs written by Frank Wilson (musician)
1966 singles
Northern soul songs
Warner Records singles